Sunil B. Gunawardene (born 6 October 1949) is a Sri Lankan former sprinter. He competed in the men's 100 metres and 200 metres at the 1972 Summer Olympics.

References

External links
 

1949 births
Living people
Athletes (track and field) at the 1972 Summer Olympics
Sri Lankan male sprinters
Olympic athletes of Sri Lanka
Place of birth missing (living people)
Asian Games medalists in athletics (track and field)
Asian Games gold medalists for Sri Lanka
Athletes (track and field) at the 1974 Asian Games
Medalists at the 1974 Asian Games
20th-century Sri Lankan people
21st-century Sri Lankan people